The Butt Memorial Bridge is a road bridge in Augusta, Georgia that carries 15th Street over the Augusta Canal. The bridge was erected in 1914 and dedicated by President William Howard Taft, a personal friend of Butt's. It is notable that the bridge was the first memorial erected to remember the Titanic disaster, and it stands today as the only memorial in Georgia dedicated to the disaster. The bridge is made of stone, featuring four pillars topped with bronze-banded globes placed over electric lights. Four lions with plaques adorn each side and end of the bridge, while lights are strung from one end of the bridge to the other. A memorial plaque is located on the center of the bridge, dedicated to Butt's memory.

The bridge was designed by William Henry Deacy, architect and Nisbet Wingfield, civil engineer. The bridge was fabricated by W. W. Leland Company.

Preservation
In 1994, the fate of the Butt Bridge (as it is affectionately known in Augusta) was in doubt. City planners wished to get $15 million from the Federal Highway Administration to reroute 15th street, creating a new thoroughfare. Plans called for the demolishing of the Butt Bridge. The Butt Memorial Bridge Legal Defense Fund, founded by Ross Snellings, created a popular movement to save the 80-year-old bridge, producing two large-scale concerts nearby, punningly called the Butt Jam. One took place in 1994 and another in 1995. Several well-known bands of the time played the venue and the unofficial slogan, "Save Our Butt," appeared all over town.

The money generated helped stave off the destruction of the bridge for a few years, until an Act of Congress saved it. The Omnibus Consolidated and Emergency Appropriations Act, 1999 included funding language through the efforts of U.S. Sen. Paul Coverdell and U.S. Rep. Charlie Norwood to provide Augusta with nearly $9 million "for implementation of a project consisting of modifications and additions to streets, railroads, and related improvements in the vicinity of the grade crossing of the CSX railroad and 15th Street."

A 2016 $1.5 million rehabilitation of the bridge includes concrete overlay, reconfiguring the lanes to allow for bikes and sidewalks and repair and preservation of the historical decorative elements such as the eagle lanterns. On August 22, 2016, the Georgia Department of Transportation (GDOT) closed the bridge. Beginning at 9 a.m., the structure closed to the traveling public for up to 300 days to allow for full deck replacement. The bridge was to reopen prior to the 2017 Masters Tournament. Local engineers expected this Georgia Transportation Investment Act – TIA bridge rehabilitation project to have all deck work finished before the event. Following a delay due to cold weather, the bridge opened temporarily on March 31, 2017. After Masters week, it closed again for installation of lights and flashers, with project completion in April 2017.

See also
 
 
 
 Transportation in Augusta, Georgia § Named bridges
 Passengers of RMS Titanic

References

Pavey, Robert. 

Bridges completed in 1914
Buildings and structures in Augusta, Georgia
Monuments and memorials in Georgia (U.S. state)
RMS Titanic memorials
Road bridges in Georgia (U.S. state)
Augusta Canal National Heritage Area
Stone bridges in the United States
Buildings and structures in Richmond County, Georgia
Transportation in Richmond County, Georgia
Transportation in Augusta, Georgia